Eubranchus occidentalis is a species of sea slug or nudibranch, a marine gastropod mollusc in the family Eubranchidae.

Distribution
This species was described from Monterey Bay, California. It is considered by some authors to be a synonym of Eubranchus rustyus.

Biology
MacFarland reports that this nudibranch feeds on the hydroid Hydractinia, which grows on the holdfasts of Cystoseira osmundacea.

References

Eubranchidae
Gastropods described in 1966